Boebeis Lake (Βοιβηΐς λίμνη, Βοιβία λίμνη, and Βοιβιάς λίμνη) was a lake of Magnesia in ancient Thessaly, mentioned by Homer, and named for the town (Boebe) on its southeastern shore. 

The lake is frequently mentioned by the ancient writers. It received the rivers Onchestus, Amyrus, and several smaller streams, but had no outlet for its waters. From its proximity to Mount Ossa, it is called "Ossaea Boebeis" by Lucan. Athena is said to have bathed her feet in its waters, which is perhaps the reason why Propertius speaks of "sanctae Boebeidos undae." The lake was a long narrow piece of water, and is now called Lake Karla from a village which has disappeared.

References

Lakes of Greece
Geography of ancient Thessaly
Locations in the Iliad
Ancient Magnesia